Leland Olds (December 31, 1890 – August 5, 1960) was an American economist interested in labor, development of public electric power, and ecology.

Education

Olds was a son of George Olds, president of Amherst College. He studied mathematics at Amherst where he was influenced by the social work movement and the Social Gospel.

Early career

“Jolly, witty, informal” as well as “very  fair-minded” and an accomplished cellist, Olds had been a minister, a teacher at Amherst, a researcher both for the federal government and the American Federation of Labor and a labor journalist. During 1918 and 1919 he was, along with Thorstein Veblen, part of the original Technical Alliance- a forerunner to the Technocracy movement In 1920 he met Franklin D. Roosevelt, Governor of New York, who appointed him to the New York State Power Authority.

In 1936, Olds served on Roosevelt's Presidential Inquiry Commission on Cooperative Enterprise in Europe.

Philosophy
Olds was a deeply religious and idealistic man, who after a long search for a worthy cause to give purpose to his life, had completely dedicated himself to the public power fight. Wide availability of cheap power was crucial, Olds felt, for the social well being of the mass of the American people.

He believed in the “complete passing of the old order of capitalism”. A complete transformation of the American economic system was needed, which had to depart from its laissez-faire impetus and economic individualism. As an alternative, Olds favored consumer cooperation as the basis of a new American economic model. Complementary to his cooperative beliefs, Olds was “very much consumer oriented”. Olds believed that, together with regulation and community owned power generation and distribution, consumer cooperation was the key to a fair power policy. In 1927 Olds advocated the operating of all hydropower utilities as “giant consumer cooperatives”.

Olds’s cooperative beliefs had come in the place of his earlier radicalism. In 1930 and 1931 he served as the “manager” of the American lecture tour of the famed Irish poet and cooperative propagandist Æ (George Russell). AE’s charisma convinced Olds even further of the necessity to organize all of society along cooperative lines.

Appointed to the FPC

Roosevelt appointed him to the Federal Power Commission in June 1939, and he served as chairman of the commission from January, 1940 until 1949.

Under his leadership the Federal Power Commission successfully pressured electric utilities to extend power into neglected rural areas and to lower electricity rates in order to increase use. When the rate reforms went into effect in Chicago the dramatic increase of usage actually resulted in an increase in the profits for the now regulated utility.  This paved the way for much of the success of the American middle class in the duration of the 20th century. In 1961 Leland Olds Station was named after him for efforts towards the power cooperative.

Unsuccessful re-nomination
His insistence on enforcing the Natural Gas Act of 1938 raised the ire of the Texas oil industry and led to the end of his career at the Federal Power Commission. Robert Caro's book Master of the Senate describes how Lyndon B. Johnson, whose campaign in the 1948 United States Senate election in Texas received extensive funding from the oil industry, defeated Olds' re-appointment by orchestrating a smear campaign to accuse Olds of Communist sympathies. This involved utilizing the staff of the House Un-American Activities Committee to dig up old writings which were then taken out of context to falsely paint Olds as a communist or communist sympathizer. The subcommittee in charge of reappointment was stacked against Olds, and anti-Olds witnesses appearing before the committee were coached by Johnson.

Personal life
Olds was married to textile artist Ruth Reeves from 1916 to 1922. He married secondly Maud Agnes Spear, with whom he had four children, including James Olds.

References

External links
 Statement by Senator John F. Kennedy on the death of Leland Olds

1890 births
1960 deaths
20th-century American economists
Amherst College alumni
Federal Power Commission
Franklin D. Roosevelt administration personnel
Truman administration personnel